Crocanthes warmarensis is a moth in the family Lecithoceridae. It was described by Kyu-Tek Park in 2011. It is found in Papua New Guinea.

The forewings are orange white with variable maculation. The hindwings have four orange-white spots between the submarginal and marginal fascia.

Etymology
The species name is derived from Warmare Dua, the type locality.

References

Moths described in 2011
Crocanthes